A squround is a container whose shape is between a square and a round tub. It resembles an oval but is sometimes closer to a rectangle with rounded corners.  These allow the contents to be easily scooped out of the container. The name is a portmanteau for "square round" (cartons), referring to a compromise between a square and a round carton. It is also sometimes known as the scround.

"Squround" can apply to shapes of things other than tubs: Watches, swimming pools, bottles, etc.

Ice cream squround containers

The term applies mostly to ice cream packaging design, where the switch to a squround from paperboard bricks, cylindrical half-gallons and other containers is motivated by consumer preference, as well as cost effectiveness.  These packages are more rectangular than square, but the side edges are rounded, while top and bottom surfaces are completely flat. Squround packaging affords some of the consumer appeal of traditional cylindrical packaging, while also packing tightly like brick-shaped square cartons.

The container is usually made of paperboard but can have thermoformed or injection molded plastic components. There is usually a separate lid made of paperboard, plastic, or both.

It offers several advantages over other ice cream packages:
 it can be easily scooped out
 it fits better in home freezers
 it packs tightly into secondary packages for shipping
 it makes more efficient use of retail shelf space
 it has good brand recognition (over the round half-gallon) since the flatter front is a more legible "billboard" for each flavor
 the lid can have  tamper-evident features.

Although squrounds are available in traditional half-gallon sizes, there exists a trend toward marketing non-traditional 56-ounce, and recently even 48-ounce sized cartons. The downsizing in carton size has not seemed to negatively affect unit sales.

Mayfield Dairy, which announced the switch to squround cartons in January 2003, told Food Engineering in April that they expect to sell the same number of 56 oz. units in 2003 as it sold 64 oz. cartons in 2002. Breyers, which in 2000 was an early adopter of the smaller package for its "Ice Cream Parlor" brands,  uses the smaller package across all its ice cream flavors. In 2008, they changed to an even smaller 48 oz container.

See also
 Squircle
 Fillet (mechanics)
 Chamfer

References

 Yam, K.L., Encyclopedia of Packaging Technology, John Wiley & Sons, 2009,

External links 
 
 

Food packaging
Ice cream
Geometric shapes